Bambi is a French documentary film, released in 2013. Directed by Sébastien Lifshitz, the film is a profile of Marie-Pierre Pruvot, an Algerian-born trans woman who had a long and prominent career as a dancer and showgirl in Paris in the 1950s and 1960s, under the stage name Bambi, before becoming a high school teacher.

The film won the Teddy Award for Best Documentary Film at the 2013 Berlin International Film Festival.

References

External links
 

2013 films
French documentary films
French LGBT-related films
Transgender-related documentary films
2013 LGBT-related films
Films directed by Sébastien Lifshitz
Films about trans women
2013 documentary films
2010s French-language films
2010s French films